Samson Haden (17 January 1902 – 1974) was an English footballer who played in the Football League for Arsenal and Notts County. He also spent ten years as manager of Peterborough United.

References

1902 births
1974 deaths
People from Royston, South Yorkshire
English footballers
Association football forwards
Castleford Town F.C. players
Arsenal F.C. players
Notts County F.C. players
Peterborough United F.C. players
English Football League players
English football managers
Peterborough United F.C. managers